Mark Ćwiertnia (born 11 January 1983), known professionally as Mark Forster, is a German-Polish singer, songwriter and television personality.

Career

Forster is of mixed German and Polish descent. His father was born in Dortmund and his mother, Agnieszka Ćwiertnia, was born in Warsaw. His mother called him Marek and in his early days as a musician used the name Marek Ćwiertnia. He grew up in Winnweiler, Kaiserslautern (State: Rhineland-Palatinate), Germany. He later moved to Berlin where he developed a career as a singer, songwriter, pianist and composer of jingles for television including for the show Krömer – Die Internationale Show. From 2007 to 2010, he accompanied actor and comedian Kurt Krömer as a pianist sidekick.

In 2006, Forster joined the band Balboa as their frontman. He was also in Kurt Krömer's Kröm De La Kröm alongside musician Mitumba Lumbumba and in 2010 was signed to German record label Four Music where he released his albums Karton in 2012. The album was produced by Ralf Christian Mayer and coproduced by Sebastian Böhnisch and recorded in Germany, France and Spain. He toured starting February 2012 with Laith Al-Deen and promoted his album. Two minor singles from the album were released: "Auf dem Weg" and "Zu dir (weit weg)".

In November 2013, he was featured in the rapper Sido's hit "Einer dieser Steine", singing in the refrain. An even bigger hit for Forster was "Au revoir", this time with roles reversed—Forster listed as primary artist and featuring Sido—with this single being a prelude to the very successful album Bauch und Kopf in 2013. The album was certified gold and included the now-smash-hit "Au revoir" and two other follow-up hit singles, "Flash mich" and the title track "Bauch und Kopf", the latter of which won Bundesvision Song Contest 2015.

In 2015, Forster became vocalist for the musical project Eff, made up of Forster as vocalist and Felix Jaehn as DJ and music producer. The two met at an event in Vienna in 2015. Eff is a reference to Felix and Forster.  Their debut single, "Stimme", topped the German Singles Chart for three consecutive weeks, also charting in Austria and Switzerland. Forster is a fan of the german football club 1.FC Kaiserslautern.

Discography

Albums

Singles

Featured in

References

External links

 

German male singers
German songwriters
German people of Polish descent
1984 births
Living people
Participants in the Bundesvision Song Contest
21st-century German male singers